The  were a group of Catholics who were executed by crucifixion on February 5, 1597, in Nagasaki, Japan. Their martyrdom is especially significant in the history of the Catholic Church in Japan.

A promising beginning to Catholic missions in Japan – with perhaps as many as 300,000 Catholics by the end of the 16th century – met complications from competition between the missionary groups, political difficulty between Portugal and Spain and factions within the government of Japan. Christianity was suppressed and it was during this time that the 26 martyrs were executed. By 1630, Catholicism had been driven underground. When Christian missionaries returned to Japan 250 years later, they found a community of "hidden Catholics" that had survived underground.

Early Christianity in Japan

On August 15, 1549, the Jesuit fathers Francis Xavier (later canonized by Gregory XV in 1622), Cosme de Torres, and Juan Fernández arrived in Kagoshima, Japan, from Portugal with hopes of bringing Catholicism to Japan. On September 29, St. Francis Xavier visited Shimazu Takahisa, the daimyō of Kagoshima, asking for permission to build the first Catholic mission in Japan. The daimyō agreed in hopes of creating a trade relationship with Europe.

The shogunate and the imperial government at first supported the Catholic mission and the missionaries, thinking that they would reduce the power of the Buddhist monks and help trade with Spain and Portugal. By the late 1500s, the government had begun to grow wary of foreign influence; the shogunate was also concerned about colonialism. The government increasingly saw Catholicism as a threat, and started persecuting Catholics. Christianity was banned and those Japanese who refused to abandon their faith were killed.

Martyrdom

In the aftermath of the San Felipe incident of 1596, 26 Catholics – four Spaniards, one Mexican, one Portuguese from India (all of whom were Franciscan missionaries), three Japanese Jesuits, and 17 Japanese members of the Third Order of St. Francis, including three young boys who served as altar boys for the missionary-priests – were, on the orders of Toyotomi Hideyoshi, arrested in January 1597, tortured, physically mutilated, and paraded through villages across Japan, then on February 5, 1597, executed by crucifixion, impaled with lances while tied to crosses on a hill that overlooks Nagasaki city.

After the persecution of 1597, there were sporadic instances of martyrdom until 1614, in all about 70. 55 Catholics were martyred in Nagasaki on September 10, 1632, in what became known as the Great Genna Martyrdom. At this time Catholicism was officially outlawed. The Church remained without clergy and theological teaching disintegrated until the arrival of Western missionaries in the 19th century.

Recognition

While there were many more martyrs, the first 26 missionary and convert martyrs came to be especially revered, the most celebrated of whom was Paul Miki. The Martyrs of Japan were canonized by the Catholic Church on June 8, 1862, by Pope Pius IX, and are listed on the calendar as Sts. Paul Miki and his Companions, commemorated on February 6, since February 5, the date of their death, is the feast of St. Agatha. They were included in the General Roman Calendar for the first time in 1969. Previously they were honoured locally, but no special Mass for them was included even in the Missae pro aliquibus locis (Masses for some places) section of the 1962 Roman Missal. Some 21st-century publications based on it do have such a Mass under February 13.

The Church of England also celebrates the Japanese martyrs liturgically with a commemoration on February 6. The Anglican Church in Japan (Nippon Sei Ko Kai), a member of the Anglican Communion, added them to its calendar in 1959 as an annual February 5 commemoration of all the martyrs of Japan and the Episcopal Church followed suit. The Evangelical Lutheran Church in America added a commemoration on February 5 to their calendar.

The Church of the Holy Japanese Martyrs (Civitavecchia, Italy) is a Catholic church dedicated to the 26 Martyrs of Nagasaki. It is decorated with artwork by Japanese artist Luke Hasegawa.

List of martyrs

These first 26 Martyrs of Japan, also known as Pedro Bautista Blasquez y Blasquez and 22 companions, along with Paulus Miki and 2 companions, were beatified on 14 September 1627 by Pope Urban VIII, and canonized on 8 June 1862 by Pope Pius IX.

Foreign Franciscan missionaries – Alcantarines
 Martin of the Ascension
 Pedro Bautista
 Philip of Jesus
 Francisco Blanco
 Francisco of Saint Michael
 Gundisalvus (Gonsalvo) Garcia

Japanese Franciscan tertiaries

Japanese Jesuits
 James Kisai
 John Soan de Goto
 Paul Miki

See also
 Basilica of the Twenty-Six Holy Martyrs of Japan (Nagasaki)
 Basilica Minore de Santuario de San Pedro Bautista
 Twenty-Six Martyrs Museum and Monument
 Martyrs of Japan
 Nanban trade
 Silence (2016 film)

References

External links

The 26 Martyrs Museum in Nagasaki City, Japan
Catholic Bishops Conference of Japan: Timeline of the Catholic Church in Japan
Daughters of St. Paul Convent, Tokyo, Japan: Prohibition of Christian religion by Hideyoshi and the 26 martyrs
St.Joseph's Church, Nishijin, Kyoto, Japan: The first Roman Catholic Church on the 26 Martyrs' pilgrimage to Nagasaki
The Japanese Martyrs
Augustinian Martyrs of Japan
Nagasaki Wiki: Detailed Access Information from Nagasaki Station to 26 Martyrs Monument

 
1597 deaths
1597 in Japan
Groups of Anglican saints
Executed children
Executed Japanese people
Japanese Roman Catholic saints
Jesuit Asia missions
Lists of Christian martyrs
Martyred groups
Martyrs
Members of the Third Order of Saint Francis
Catholic martyrs of the Early Modern era
Roman Catholic child saints
Lists of saints
Martyrs
Persecution by Buddhists
People executed by Japan
 Martyrs
Beatifications by Pope Pius IX
Canonizations by Pope Pius IX
Groups of Roman Catholic saints